The 1908–09 Auburn Tigers men's basketball team represented Auburn University during the 1908–09 Intercollegiate Athletic Association of the United States college basketball season. The head coach was Mike Donahue, coaching his fourth season with the Tigers.

Schedule

|-

References

Auburn Tigers men's basketball seasons
Auburn
Auburn Tigers men's basketball team
Auburn Tigers men's basketball team